James (Jim) Matthew Wolf is an American singer/songwriter.

Early life
Born in Norwalk, Connecticut, Wolf grew up in Fairfield, Connecticut and was inspired by his brother's band Villanova Junction which featured a young John Mayer. Observing the band from his parents' basement, Wolf participated in many writing and recording sessions with the band. He then dedicated his life to music.

Career 

Jim Wolf has become a familiar presence in the South Korean Music scene since 2014, when his single, “Make You My Lady”, was used in the wedding of popular South Korean actors, ChaeRim and Gao Zi Qi.

Wolf's single "Make You My Lady" from part 1 of the series "Strange, Weird, and Romantic", landed in the top 100 MNET Comprehensive Pop Charts for Asia in October–November 2014 for three weeks, peaking at #44 above "Let It Go" by Idina Menzel  and staying in the Top 50 for 19 days. "Make You My Lady" was included in a Korean drama, gaining him international exposure.

"Make You My Lady" was used on Background Music on My Secret Romance (Hangul: 애타는 로맨스; RR: Aetaneun Romaenseu) a 2017 South Korean television series starring Sung Hoon and Song Ji-eun. It aired primetime on the cable network OCN on Episode 11, titled "I'm the Only One Who Can't Date (나만 안 되는 연애)", which aired on Monday, May 23, 2017 and Tuesday, May 24, 2017.

South Korean Primetime TV Drama "Heart Signal 2" had used "Make You My Lady" by Jim Wolf as Background Music [BGM] in two different episodes. It appeared on Episode 4 and Episode 8 of the series.  The TV show has gone on to be a huge success.

Jim Wolf was a Special Guest and Panel Speaker at KCON 2018 in New York on June 24, 2018 on a panel titled The Art of K-Pop Music Design. Wolf shared the panel stage with K-Pop Hit Songwriter, Andreas Oberg, and was moderated by Emma Chang (UMU of ReacttotheK).

On January 14, 2019, "Make You My Lady" peaked at #2 on MelOn's Top 100 Country/Folk/Blues chart, where it stayed for 9 days, averaging 2nd place for the week of January 14 to January 20.  MelOn is Korea's No.1 Streaming Platform.

"Make You My lady" ended up in TOP3 position for the month of January 2019 on MelOn's Top 100 Country/Folk/Blues chart.

Wolf was nominated for an American Songwriting Award in the Folk music category for "Just to Be with You".  Wolf's single from the album, Legacy, “Door's Open (Feat. Meghann Wright)", was picked Best of 2014 for Radio 104.1 WMRQ.  On December 16, 2014, he performed at the Finals for the Locals Live Competition at Mohegan Sun's Wolf Den in Uncasville, Connecticut.

Partial discography

 Drunken Love (2022)
 Strange, Weird, and Romantic (Part. 3) (2021)
 I’m Here For You (2020)
 Wild Heart (2020)
 Forever Sunday (2020)
 Another Lover (2020)
 The Way Your Body Feels At Christmas (2019)
 November Rain (2019)
 Can’t Get Away From You (2019)
 Lemon Wine (2019)
 Demos From The Before Time (2018)
 Turn This World Around (2018)
 First Kiss (2018)
 Acoustic (2017)
 Strange, Weird, and Romantic (Part. 2) (2016)
 Legacy (2014)
 Strange, Weird, and Romantic (Part. 1) (2012)
 Sleeping with Strangers (2010)

References

Living people
Musicians from Norwalk, Connecticut
Singer-songwriters from New York (state)
Year of birth missing (living people)
Singer-songwriters from Connecticut